Memphis State Tigers basketball may refer to either of the basketball teams that represent the University of Memphis:
Memphis Tigers men's basketball
Memphis Tigers women's basketball